Forest Park is a town in Oklahoma County, Oklahoma, United States, and a part of the Oklahoma City metropolitan area.  The population was 998 at the 2010 census.

Geography
Forest Park is located at  (35.507260, -97.451432).

Demographics

As of the census of 2010, there were 998 people living in the town. There were 462 housing units at an average density of 210.4 per square mile (81.4/km2). The racial makeup of the town was 22.70% White, 72.14% African American, 1.03% Native American, 0.66% Asian, and 3.47% from two or more races. Hispanic or Latino of any race were 0.75% of the population.

There were 432 households in the town, out of which 19.9% had children under the age of 18 living with them, 60.3% were married couples living together, 11.5% had a female householder with no husband present, and 24.9% were non-families. 21.9% of all households were made up of individuals, and 11.1% had someone living alone who was 65 years of age or older. The average household size was 2.46 and the average family size was 2.85.

In the town, the population was spread out, with 18.9% under the age of 18, 6.2% from 18 to 24, 18.5% from 25 to 44, 33.9% from 45 to 64, and 22.5% who were 65 years of age or older. The median age was 49 years. For every 100 females, there were 88.7 males. For every 100 females age 18 and over, there were 87.0 males.

The median income for a household in the town was $55,536, and the median income for a family was $60,163. Males had a median income of $37,000 versus $28,250 for females. The per capita income for the town was $25,300. About 4.7% of families and 5.1% of the population were below the poverty line, including 9.1% of those under age 18 and 6.8% of those age 65 or over.

References

External links
 Encyclopedia of Oklahoma History and Culture - Forest Park

Oklahoma City metropolitan area
Towns in Oklahoma County, Oklahoma
Towns in Oklahoma